Sonnet 139 is one of 154 sonnets written by the English playwright and poet William Shakespeare.

Structure 
Sonnet 139 is an English or Shakespearean sonnet. The English sonnet has three quatrains, followed by a final rhyming couplet. It follows the typical rhyme scheme of the form ABAB CDCD EFEF GG and is composed in iambic pentameter, a type of poetic metre based on five pairs of metrically weak/strong syllabic positions. The 6th line exemplifies a regular iambic pentameter:

 ×    /      ×  /    ×   /      ×   /   × / 
Dear heart, forbear to glance thine eye aside: (139.6)
/ = ictus, a metrically strong syllabic position. × = nonictus.

Line 3 begins with a common metrical variation, an initial reversal:

 /     ×  ×   /     ×   /     ×   /     ×  / 
Wound me not with thine eye, but with thy tongue; (139.3)

Initial reversals also occur in lines 5 and 14, and potentially in line 9. Line 13 exhibits a rightward movement of the fourth ictus (resulting in a four-position figure, × × / /, sometimes referred to as a minor ionic):

 ×   /  ×   /   ×   /    × ×   /     / 
Yet do not so; but since I am near slain, (139.13)

The meter demands both occurrences of "power" in line 4 function as single syllables. The words "elsewhere" (lines 5 and 12) and "outright" (line 14) are double-stressed, and in this context move their stresses to the second syllable.

Notes

References

External links
www.shakespeare-online.com

British poems
Sonnets by William Shakespeare